Tribute is a double-CD live album by American pianist Keith Jarrett's "Standards Trio" featuring Gary Peacock and Jack DeJohnette recorded on October 15, 1989 at the Kölner Philharmonie in Cologne (Köln), West Germany and released by ECM Records in 1990.

October 1989 Tour
Tribute was recorded in concert during the "Standards trio" October 1989 European tour in which, according to www.keithjarrett.org, offered 14 recitals in 28 days:

 1 - Palais des Beaux-Arts, Brussels (Belgium)
 3 - Berwaldhallen, Stockholm (Sweden)
 5 - Koncertsalen i Tivoli, Copenhagen (Denmark)
 7 - Konserthuset, Oslo (Norway) recorded and released as Standards in Norway [ECM 1542]
 9 - Royal Festival Hall, London (England)
 11 - Graf-Zeppelin-Haus, Friedrichshafen (Germany)
 15 - Kölner Philharmonie, Cologne (Germany) 
 16 - Philharmonie Gasteig, Munich (Germany) 
 18 - Musikhalle, Hamburg (Germany) 
 19 - Kongreßalle Killesberg, Stuttgart (Germany) 
 21 - Alte Oper, Frankfurt (Germany) 
 23 - Palais de la Musique, Strasbourg (France)
 25 - Arsenal, Metz (France)
 28 - Théâtre des Champs-Elysées, Paris (France)

Reception
The Allmusic review by Richard S. Ginell awarded the album 4½ stars and states, "While the Standards Trio rarely takes anything for granted, transforming everything in its path, the results are not quite as inventive here as on other releases".

Track listing 

 "Lover Man" [dedicated to Lee Konitz] (Jimmy Davis, Ram Ramirez, James Sherman) -  13:14  
 "I Hear a Rhapsody" [dedicated to Jim Hall] (Jack Baker, George Fragos, Dick Gasparre) - 11:19  
 "Little Girl Blue" [dedicated to Nancy Wilson] (Lorenz Hart, Richard Rodgers) - 6:05  
 "Solar" [dedicated to Bill Evans] (Miles Davis) - 9:32  
 "Sun Prayer" (Keith Jarrett) - 14:15  
 "Just in Time" [dedicated to Sonny Rollins] (Betty Comden, Adolph Green, Jule Styne) - 10:07  
 "Smoke Gets in Your Eyes" [dedicated to Coleman Hawkins] (Otto Harbach, Jerome Kern) - 8:26  
 "All of You" [dedicated to Miles Davis] (Cole Porter) - 8:08  
 "Ballad of the Sad Young Men" [dedicated to Anita O'Day] (Fran Landesman, Tommy Wolf) - 7:02  
 "All the Things You Are" [dedicated to Charlie Parker] (Oscar Hammerstein II, Jerome Kern) - 8:57  
 "It's Easy to Remember" [dedicated to John Coltrane]  (Hart, Rodgers) - 7:08  
 "U Dance" (Jarrett) - 10:46

Total effective playing time: 1:51:23 (the album contains 3:42 applause approximately)

Personnel 
 Keith Jarrett – piano
 Gary Peacock - bass
 Jack DeJohnette - drums

Production
 Manfred Eicher - producer
 Jan Erik Kongshaug - engineer (recording)
 O. Fries - engineer (recording)
 Barbara Wojirsch - cover design

References 

Standards Trio albums
Gary Peacock live albums
Jack DeJohnette live albums
Keith Jarrett live albums
1989 live albums
ECM Records live albums
Albums produced by Manfred Eicher